This is a list of members (MSPs) returned to the first Scottish Parliament at the 1999 Scottish Parliament election. Of the 129 members, 73 were elected from first past the post constituencies with a further 56 members being returned from eight regions, each electing seven MSPs as a form of mixed member proportional representation .

The 1999 election produced a hung parliament, with the Labour MSPs forming the largest minority.  Consequently, they formed a coalition government with the Liberal Democrats to form the first Scottish Executive.

Composition 

Government coalition parties denoted with bullets (•)

Graphical representation
These are graphical representations of the Scottish Parliament showing a comparison of party strengths as it was directly after the 1999 election and its composition at the time of its dissolution in March 2003:

  

Note this is not the official seating plan of the Scottish Parliament.

List of MSPs
This is a list of MSPs at dissolution.  For a list of MSPs elected in the 1999 Scottish Parliament election, see here. The changes table below records all changes in party affiliation during the session.

Former MSPs

Changes 
During the 1999 to 2003 period there were one death and three resignations amongst constituency MSPs, and replacement MSPs were elected in by-elections. Also there was one resignation amongst the additional member MSPs, with that MSP being replaced by the candidate who was next on the additional members list at the time of the 1999 election.

See also

 Member of the Scottish Parliament
 1999 Scottish Parliament election
 Executive of the 1st Scottish Parliament
 Scottish Parliament

References

External links
 Scottish Parliament website
 Current and previous Members of the Scottish Parliament (MSPs), on the Scottish Parliament website

1